Richard Fourness Johnston (July 27, 1925November 15, 2014) was an American ornithologist, academic and author. He was born in Oakland, California, and early developed an interest in zoology, especially birds. He served in the Army during World War II, and was injured in the European theater. He attended the University of California, Berkeley, where he earned a PhD in biology. In 1958, he joined the Zoology Department at the University of Kansas, Lawrence and became curator of its Natural History Museum. His research interests included the house sparrow (English sparrow) P. domesticus and the feral pigeon C. livia. He was awarded the title of professor emeritus in the Department of Ecology and Evolutionary Biology. He was the founding editor of the scientific journal  Annual Review of Ecology and Systematics (1970-1991).

His outside interests included searching for mushrooms, tending to his small vineyard, and making wine. His wife predeceased him; he was survived by their three daughters.

Works 
 1960 Hand-List of the Birds of Kansas. Museum of Natural History, University of Kansas.
 1964 Directory to the Bird-Life of Kansas. Museum of Natural History, University of Kansas.
 1964 The Breeding Birds of Kansas. University of Kansas Publications, Museum of Natural History, University of Kansas, Vol. 12, No. 14, pp. 575–655.
 1965 A Directory to the Birds of Kansas. Museum of Natural History, University of Kansas.
 1984 Reproductive Ecology of the Feral Pigeon, 'Columba livia. Occasional papers of the Museum of Natural History, University of Kansas, No. 114.
 1995 Feral Pigeons (with Marián Janiga). Oxford University Press, .

References

External links
 

1925 births
2014 deaths
People from Oakland, California
University of California, Berkeley alumni
University of Kansas faculty
American ornithologists
American ornithological writers
American male non-fiction writers
Annual Reviews (publisher) editors